Posyolok Kamyshlinskogo melkombinata is a rural locality (a settlement) in Ufa, Bashkortostan, Russia. The population was 44 as of 2010. There is 1 street.

Geography 
The settlement is located 25 km south of Ufa. Kamyshly is the nearest rural locality.

References 

Rural localities in Ufa urban okrug